Feline may refer to:

Zoology
 Loosely, Felidae, a member of the cat family, which includes the subfamilies Pantherinae and Felinae (conventionally designated a felid)
 Following the taxonomic convention, Felinae, the subfamily of Felidae that includes domestic cats and smaller wild cats
 Cat, the domesticated feline

Music
 Feline (band), a late-1990s London-based English rock group
 Feline (The Stranglers album), 1983
 Feline (1998 album), the self-titled album by Feline, expanded release of Save Your Face
 Feline (Ella Eyre album) (2015), the debut studio album by Ella Eyre
 Feline (song), a song on Delta Goodrem's 2016 album Wings of the Wild

Comics
 Feline (comics), a fictional character from the Malibu comics line